Cystine is the oxidized derivative of the amino acid cysteine and has the formula (SCH2CH(NH2)CO2H)2. It is a white solid that is poorly soluble in water. As a residue in proteins, cystine serves two functions: a site of redox reactions and a mechanical linkage that allows proteins to retain their three-dimensional structure.

Formation and reactions

Structure
Cystine is the disulfide derived from the amino acid cysteine. The conversion can be viewed as an oxidation:

Cystine contains a disulfide bond, two amine groups, and two carboxylic acid groups. As for other amino acids, the amine and carboxylic acid groups exist is rapid equilibrium with the ammonium-carboxylate tautomer. The great majority of the literature concerns the l,l-cystine, derived from l-cysteine. Other isomers include d,d-cystine and the meso isomer d,l-cystine, neither of which is biologically significant.

Occurrence 
Cystine is common in many foods such as eggs, meat, dairy products, and whole grains as well as skin, horns and hair. It was not recognized as being derived of proteins until it was isolated from the horn of a cow in 1899. Human hair and skin contain approximately 10–14% cystine by mass.

History 
 
Cystine was discovered in 1810 by the English chemist William Hyde Wollaston, who called it "cystic oxide". In 1833, the Swedish chemist Jöns Jacob Berzelius named the amino acid "cystine". The Norwegian chemist Christian J. Thaulow determined, in 1838, the empirical formula of cystine. In 1884, the German chemist Eugen Baumann found that when cystine was treated with a reducing agent, cystine revealed itself to be a dimer of a monomer which he named "cysteïne". In 1899, cystine was first isolated from protein (horn tissue) by the Swedish chemist Karl A. H. Mörner (1855-1917). The chemical structure of cystine was determined by synthesis in 1903 by the German chemist Emil Erlenmeyer.

Redox
It is formed from the oxidation of two cysteine molecules, which results in the formation of a disulfide bond. In cell biology, cystine residues (found in proteins) only exist in non-reductive (oxidative) organelles, such as the secretory pathway (endoplasmic reticulum, Golgi apparatus, lysosomes, and vesicles) and extracellular spaces (e.g., extracellular matrix). Under reductive conditions (in the cytoplasm, nucleus, etc.) cysteine is predominant. The disulfide link is readily reduced to give the corresponding thiol cysteine. Typical thiols for this reaction are mercaptoethanol and dithiothreitol:
(SCH2CH(NH2)CO2H)2  +  2 RSH  →  2 HSCH2CH(NH2)CO2H  +  RSSR
Because of the facility of the thiol-disulfide exchange, the nutritional benefits and sources of cystine are identical to those for the more-common cysteine. Disulfide bonds cleave more rapidly at higher temperatures.

Cystine-based disorders
The presence of cystine in urine is often indicative of amino acid reabsorption defects. Cystinuria has been reported to occur in dogs.
In humans the excretion of high levels of cystine crystals can be indicative of cystinosis, a rare genetic disease.

Biological transport
Cystine serves as a substrate for the cystine-glutamate antiporter. This transport system, which is highly specific for cystine and glutamate, increases the concentration of cystine inside the cell. In this system, the anionic form of cystine is transported in exchange for glutamate. Cystine is quickly reduced to cysteine. Cysteine prodrugs, e.g. acetylcysteine, induce release of glutamate into the extracellular space.

Nutritional supplements

Cysteine supplements are sometimes marketed as anti-aging products with claims of improved skin elasticity. Cysteine is more easily absorbed by the body than cystine, so most supplements contain cysteine rather than cystine. N-acetyl-cysteine (NAC) is better absorbed than other cysteine or cystine supplements.

See also
 Lanthionine, similar with mono-sulfide link
 Protein tertiary structure 
 Sullivan reaction
 Cystinosis

References

External links

Organic disulfides
Sulfur amino acids
Non-proteinogenic amino acids